The 2014 European Parliament election in Poland elected the delegation from Poland to the European Parliament. It took place on 25 May 2014. The Polish electorate will elect 51 MEPs, compared to 50 in the 2009 election. (In December 2011, under the terms of the Lisbon Treaty, one additional MEP from the People's Party entered the Parliament, bringing the number of Polish MEPs to 51). The number of MEPs is a result of the 2013 reapportionment of seats in the European Parliament. This means that Poland will have 6% of the total seats in the European Parliament.

MEPs by European Political Group (as at 30 January 2014)

Contesting committees 

Political parties, coalitions of political parties, and nonpartisan citizens wishing to nominate candidates for the election were obliged to establish election committees and announce their creation to the State Electoral Commission until 7 April 2014. Establishment of an independent committee required signatures of at least 1,000 registered voters. 20 committees were established.

The committees were able to register lists of 5 to 10 candidates in each electoral district until 15 April. Each list had to be supported by signatures of at least 10,000 voters residing in the district. However, a committee that had collected enough signatures in at least 7 electoral districts were allowed to register lists in the remaining districts regardless of local support.

As of 24 April, the State Electoral Commission has confirmed that 9 committees registered candidates in all 13 constituencies.

Additionally 3 committees of political parties registered lists of candidates in fewer electoral districts:

8 committees failed to submit lists or collect signatures:

Leaders by constituency

Opinion polls

Results

MEPs by political group

References

External links 
 (pl) European Parliament election, 2014 on PKW.gov.pl

Poland
2014
2014 elections in Poland